Washington city government may refer to:
City government in Washington (state)
Government of Washington, D.C.